Acraea lofua is a butterfly in the family Nymphalidae. It is found in north-eastern Zambia.

Description

A. lofua Eltr. (60 e). male. Wings above reddish ochre-yellow, at the base narrowly scaled with black and with the usual black dots; fore wing with black marginal band, which is gradually widened at the apex into a spot 3 mm. in breadth, beneath lighter but otherwise almost as above; hind wing above with very broad unspotted, deep black marginal band, which is broader in the middle, beneath with light yellow ground-colour and white marginal spots. The female differs in having the forewing light ochre-yellowish without black discal dots and the hindwing light reddish grey-yellow; the basal and discal dots are very small and the marginal band somewhat narrower than in the male and with grey marginal spots above also. Rhodesia, on the Lofu River.

Biology
The habitat consists of deciduous woodland.

Taxonomy
It is a member of the Acraea cepheus species group. See also Pierre & Bernaud, 2014.

References

Butterflies described in 1911
lofua
Endemic fauna of Zambia
Butterflies of Africa